Itagata is an administrative ward in Rungwe District, Mbeya Region, Tanzania. In 2016 the Tanzania National Bureau of Statistics report there were 1,002 people in the ward. The ward has 2 neighborhoods; Itagata, and Ikama.

References 

Wards of Mbeya Region
Rungwe District
Constituencies of Tanzania